Arthur Waako Mboizi, known by his sobriquet Katalo, is a Ugandan politician and a member of the parliament representing Budaka County, Budaka District. He was elected to the Parliament of Uganda as an independent candidate in 2021. In the parliament of Uganda, he serves on the Committee on Gender, Labour and Social Development.

Career 
Mboizi began his political career as LC 1 and LC3 district councillor before being elected Chairperson of Budaka District Council. In 2016, he ran for Budaka LC5 seat but was defeated by Sam Mulomi. Mboizi was the district chairperson of National Resistance Movement political party for 15 years. In 2020, he ran as an independent candidate for the Budaka seat in the parliament campaigning for improvement of agriculture, educational system and balance trade. He won in the general election defeating incumbent Kezekia Mbogo.

References 

Living people
21st-century Ugandan politicians
National Resistance Movement politicians
Members of the Parliament of Uganda
Year of birth missing (living people)